Güneş is a Turkish word meaning the Sun, which can be used as a given name and surname.

Güneş may refer to:

People

Given name
 Güneş Gürle (born 1975), Turkish opera singer
 Güneş Taner (born 1949), Turkish politician and former government minister

Surname
 Ali Güneş (born 1978), Turkish footballer
 Burcu Güneş (born 1975), Turkish female singer
 Hasan Fehmi Güneş (1934–2021), Turkish politician
 Hatice Gunes, Turkish computer scientist
 Hurşit Güneş (born 1957), Turkish economist and politician
 Melisa Güneş (born 2001), Turkish female weightlifter
 Osman Güneş (born 1952), Turkish bureaucrat
 Şenol Güneş (born 1952), Turkish footballer
 Serdar Güneş (born 1987), Turkish footballer
 Turan Güneş (1922–1982), Turkish politician 
 Uğur Güneş (born 1993), Turkish volleyball player
 Zehra Güneş (born 1999), Turkish female volleyball player

Fictional characters
 Güneş, in Follow Kadri, Not Your Heart

Other uses
Güneş, a Turkish newspaper
Güneş SK, a defunct Turkish sports club of Istanbul, Turkey

Turkish masculine given names
Turkish feminine given names
Turkish-language surnames

de:Güneş